

Events

Pre-1600
38 BC – Octavian divorces his wife Scribonia and marries Livia Drusilla, ending the fragile peace between the Second Triumvirate and Sextus Pompey.
1362 – Saint Marcellus' flood kills at least 25,000 people on the shores of the North Sea.
1377 – Pope Gregory XI reaches Rome, after deciding to move the Papacy back to Rome from Avignon.
1524 – Giovanni da Verrazzano sets sail westward from Madeira to find a sea route to the Pacific Ocean.
1562 – France grants religious toleration to the Huguenots in the Edict of Saint-Germain.
1595 – During the French Wars of Religion, Henry IV of France declares war on Spain.

1601–1900
1608 – Emperor Susenyos I of Ethiopia surprises an Oromo army at Ebenat; his army reportedly kills 12,000 Oromo at the cost of 400 of his men.
1648 – England's Long Parliament passes the "Vote of No Addresses", breaking off negotiations with King Charles I and thereby setting the scene for the second phase of the English Civil War.
1649 – The Second Ormonde Peace creates an alliance between the Irish Royalists and Confederates during the War of the Three Kingdoms. The coalition was then decisively defeated during the Cromwellian conquest of Ireland.
1773 – Captain James Cook leads the first expedition to sail south of the Antarctic Circle.
1781 – American Revolutionary War: Battle of Cowpens: Continental troops under Brigadier General Daniel Morgan defeat British forces under Lieutenant Colonel Banastre Tarleton at the battle in South Carolina.
1799 – Maltese patriot Dun Mikiel Xerri, along with a number of other patriots, is executed.
1811 – Mexican War of Independence: In the Battle of Calderón Bridge, a heavily outnumbered Spanish force of 6,000 troops defeats nearly 100,000 Mexican revolutionaries.
1852 – The United Kingdom signs the Sand River Convention with the South African Republic.
1873 – A group of Modoc warriors defeats the United States Army in the First Battle of the Stronghold, part of the Modoc War.
1885 – A British force defeats a large Dervish army at the Battle of Abu Klea in the Sudan.
1893 – Lorrin A. Thurston, along with the Citizens' Committee of Public Safety, led the Overthrow of the Kingdom of Hawaii and the government of Queen Liliuokalani.
1899 – The United States takes possession of Wake Island in the Pacific Ocean.

1901–present
1903 – El Yunque National Forest in Puerto Rico becomes part of the United States National Forest System as the Luquillo Forest Reserve.
1904 – Anton Chekhov's The Cherry Orchard receives its premiere performance at the Moscow Art Theatre.
1912 – British polar explorer Captain Robert Falcon Scott reaches the South Pole, one month after Roald Amundsen.
1915 – Russia defeats Ottoman Turkey in the Battle of Sarikamish during the Caucasus Campaign of World War I.
1917 – The United States pays Denmark 25 million for the Virgin Islands.
1918 – Finnish Civil War: The first serious battles take place between the Red Guards and the White Guard.
1920 – Alcohol Prohibition begins in the United States as the Volstead Act goes into effect.
1941 – Franco-Thai War: Vichy French forces inflict a decisive defeat over the Royal Thai Navy.
1943 – World War II: Greek submarine Papanikolis captures the 200-ton sailing vessel Agios Stefanos and mans her with part of her crew.
1944 – World War II: Allied forces launch the first of four assaults on Monte Cassino with the intention of breaking through the Winter Line and seizing Rome, an effort that would ultimately take four months and cost 105,000 Allied casualties.
1945 – World War II: The Vistula–Oder Offensive forces German troops out of Warsaw.
  1945   – The SS-Totenkopfverbände begin the evacuation of the Auschwitz concentration camp as the Red Army closes in.
  1945   – Swedish diplomat Raoul Wallenberg is taken into Soviet custody while in Hungary; he is never publicly seen again.
1946 – The UN Security Council holds its first session.
1948 – The Renville Agreement between the Netherlands and Indonesia is ratified.
1950 – The Great Brink's Robbery: Eleven thieves steal more than $2 million from an armored car company's offices in Boston.
  1950   – United Nations Security Council Resolution 79 relating to arms control is adopted.
1961 – U.S. President Dwight D. Eisenhower delivers a televised farewell address to the nation three days before leaving office, in which he warns against the accumulation of power by the "military–industrial complex" as well as the dangers of massive spending, especially deficit spending.
  1961   – Former Congolese Prime Minister Patrice Lumumba is murdered in circumstances suggesting the support and complicity of the governments of Belgium and the United States.
1966 – Palomares incident: A B-52 bomber collides with a KC-135 Stratotanker over Spain, killing seven airmen, and dropping three 70-kiloton nuclear bombs near the town of Palomares and another one into the sea.
1969 – Black Panther Party members Bunchy Carter and John Huggins are killed during a meeting in Campbell Hall on the campus of UCLA.
1977 – Capital punishment in the United States resumes after a ten-year hiatus, as convicted murderer Gary Gilmore is executed by firing squad in Utah.
1981 – President of the Philippines Ferdinand Marcos lifts martial law eight years and five months after declaring it.
1991 – Gulf War: Operation Desert Storm begins early in the morning as aircraft strike positions across Iraq, it is also the first major combat sortie for the F-117. LCDR Scott Speicher's F/A-18C Hornet from VFA-81 is shot down by a Mig-25 and is the first American casualty of the War. Iraq fires eight Scud missiles into Israel in an unsuccessful bid to provoke Israeli retaliation.
  1991   – Crown Prince Harald of Norway becomes King Harald V, following the death of his father, King Olav V.
1992 – During a visit to South Korea, Japanese Prime Minister Kiichi Miyazawa apologizes for forcing Korean women into sexual slavery during World War II.
1994 – The 6.7  Northridge earthquake shakes the Greater Los Angeles Area with a maximum Mercalli intensity of IX (Violent), leaving 57 people dead and more than 8,700 injured.
1995 – The 6.9  Great Hanshin earthquake shakes the southern Hyōgo Prefecture with a maximum Shindo of VII, leaving 5,502–6,434 people dead, and 251,301–310,000 displaced.
1996 – The Czech Republic applies for membership in the European Union.
1997 – Cape Canaveral Air Force Station: A Delta II carrying the GPS IIR-1 satellite explodes 13 seconds after launch, dropping 250 tons of burning rocket remains around the launch pad.
1998 – Clinton–Lewinsky scandal: Matt Drudge breaks the story of the Bill Clinton–Monica Lewinsky affair on his Drudge Report website.
2002 – Mount Nyiragongo erupts in the Democratic Republic of the Congo, displacing an estimated 400,000 people.
2007 – The Doomsday Clock is set to five minutes to midnight in response to North Korea's nuclear testing.
2010 – Rioting begins between Muslim and Christian groups in Jos, Nigeria, results in at least 200 deaths.
2013 – Former cyclist Lance Armstrong confesses to his doping in an airing of Oprah's Next Chapter.
2016 – President Barack Obama announces the Joint Comprehensive Plan of Action.
2017 – The search for Malaysia Airlines Flight 370 is announced to be suspended.
 2023 – An avalanche strikes Nyingchi, Tibet, killing 28 people.

Births

Pre-1600
1342 – Philip II, Duke of Burgundy (d. 1404)
1429 – Antonio del Pollaiuolo, Italian artist (d.c. 1498)
1463 – Frederick III, Elector of Saxony (d. 1525)
  1463   – Antoine Duprat, French cardinal (d. 1535)
1472 – Guidobaldo da Montefeltro, Italian captain (d. 1508)
1484 – George Spalatin, German priest and reformer (d. 1545)
1501 – Leonhart Fuchs, German physician and botanist (d. 1566)
1504 – Pope Pius V (d. 1572)
1517 – Henry Grey, 1st Duke of Suffolk, English Duke (d. 1554)
1560 – Gaspard Bauhin, Swiss botanist, physician, and academic (d. 1624)
1574 – Robert Fludd, English physician, astrologer, and mathematician (d. 1637)
1593 – William Backhouse, English alchemist and astrologer (d. 1662)
1600 – Pedro Calderón de la Barca, Spanish playwright and poet (d. 1681)

1601–1900
1612 – Thomas Fairfax, English general and politician (d. 1671)
1640 – Jonathan Singletary Dunham, American settler (d. 1724)
1659 – Antonio Veracini, Italian violinist and composer (d. 1745)
1666 – Antonio Maria Valsalva, Italian anatomist and physician (d. 1723)
1686 – Archibald Bower, Scottish historian and author (d. 1766)
1706 – Benjamin Franklin, American publisher, inventor, and politician, 6th President of Pennsylvania (d. 1790)
1712 – John Stanley, English organist and composer (d. 1786)
1719 – William Vernon, American businessman (d. 1806)
1728 – Johann Gottfried Müthel, German pianist and composer (d. 1788)
1732 – Stanisław August Poniatowski, Polish-Lithuanian king (d. 1798)
1734 – François-Joseph Gossec, French composer and conductor (d. 1829)
1761 – Sir James Hall, 4th Baronet, Scottish geologist and geophysicist (d. 1832)
1789 – August Neander, German historian and theologian (d. 1850)
1793 – Antonio José Martínez, Spanish-American priest, rancher and politician (d. 1867)
1814 – Ellen Wood, English author (d. 1887)
1820 – Anne Brontë, English author and poet (d. 1849)
1828 – Lewis A. Grant, American lawyer and general, Medal of Honor recipient (d. 1918)
  1828   – Ede Reményi, Hungarian violinist and composer (d. 1898)
1832 – Henry Martyn Baird, American historian and academic (d. 1906)
1834 – August Weismann, German biologist, zoologist, and geneticist (d. 1914)
1850 – Joaquim Arcoverde de Albuquerque Cavalcanti, Brazilian cardinal (d. 1930)
  1850   – Alexander Taneyev, Russian pianist and composer (d. 1918)
1851 – A. B. Frost, American author and illustrator (d. 1928)
1853 – Alva Belmont, American suffragist (d. 1933) 
  1853   – T. Alexander Harrison, American painter and academic (d. 1930)
1857 – Wilhelm Kienzl, Austrian pianist, composer, and conductor (d. 1941)
  1857   – Eugene Augustin Lauste, French-American engineer (d. 1935)
1858 – Tomás Carrasquilla, Colombian author (d. 1940)
1860 – Douglas Hyde, Irish academic and politician, 1st President of Ireland (d. 1949)
1863 – David Lloyd George, Welsh lawyer and politician, Prime Minister of the United Kingdom (d. 1945)
  1863   – Konstantin Stanislavski, Russian actor and director (d. 1938)
1865 – Sir Charles Fergusson, 7th Baronet, English general and politician, 3rd Governor-General of New Zealand (d. 1951)
1867 – Carl Laemmle, German-born American film producer, co-founded Universal Studios (d. 1939)
  1867   – Sir Alfred Rawlinson, 3rd Baronet, English colonel, pilot, and polo player (d. 1934)
1871 – David Beatty, 1st Earl Beatty, English admiral (d. 1936)
  1871   – Nicolae Iorga, Romanian historian and politician, 34th Prime Minister of Romania (d. 1940)
1875 – Florencio Sánchez, Uruguayan journalist and playwright (d. 1910)
1876 – Frank Hague, American lawyer and politician, 30th Mayor of Jersey City (d. 1956)
1877 – Marie Zdeňka Baborová-Čiháková, Czech botanist and zoologist (d. 1937)
  1877   – May Gibbs, English-Australian author and illustrator (d. 1969)
1880 – Mack Sennett, Canadian-American actor, director, and producer (d. 1960)
1881 – Antoni Łomnicki, Polish mathematician and academic (d. 1941)
  1881   – Harry Price, English psychologist and author (d. 1948)
1882 – Noah Beery, Sr., American actor (d. 1946)
1883 – Compton Mackenzie, English-Scottish author, poet, and playwright (d. 1972)
1886 – Glenn L. Martin, American pilot and businessman, founded the Glenn L. Martin Company (d. 1955)
1887 – Ola Raknes, Norwegian psychoanalyst and philologist (d. 1975)
1888 – Babu Gulabrai, Indian philosopher and author (d. 1963)
1897 – Marcel Petiot, French physician and serial killer (d. 1946)
1898 – Lela Mevorah, Serbian librarian (d. 1972) 
1899 – Al Capone, American mob boss (d. 1947)
  1899   – Robert Maynard Hutchins, American philosopher and academic (d. 1977)
  1899   – Nevil Shute, English engineer and author (d. 1960)

1901–present
1901 – Aron Gurwitsch, Lithuanian-American philosopher and author (d. 1973)
1904 – Hem Vejakorn, Thai painter and illustrator (d. 1969)
1905 – Ray Cunningham, American baseball player (d. 2005)
  1905   – Peggy Gilbert, American saxophonist and bandleader (d. 2007)
  1905   – Eduard Oja, Estonian composer, conductor, educator, and critic (d. 1950)
  1905   – Guillermo Stábile, Argentinian footballer and manager (d. 1966)
  1905   – Jan Zahradníček, Czech poet and translator (d. 1960)
1907 – Henk Badings, Indonesian-Dutch composer and engineer (d. 1987)
  1907   – Alfred Wainwright, British fellwalker, guidebook author and illustrator (d. 1991)
1908 – Cus D'Amato, American boxing manager and trainer (d. 1985)
1911 – Busher Jackson, Canadian ice hockey player (d. 1966)
  1911   – John S. McCain Jr., American admiral (d. 1981)
  1911   – George Stigler, American economist and academic, Nobel Prize laureate (d. 1991)
1914 – Anacleto Angelini, Italian-Chilean businessman (d. 2007)
  1914   – Irving Brecher, American director, producer, and screenwriter (d. 2008)
  1914   – Paul Royle, Australian lieutenant and pilot (d. 2015)
  1914   – William Stafford, American poet and author (d. 1993)
1916 – Peter Frelinghuysen Jr., American lieutenant and politician (d. 2011)
1917 – M. G. Ramachandran, Indian actor, director, and politician, 3rd Chief Minister of Tamil Nadu (d. 1987)
1918 – Keith Joseph, English lawyer and politician, Secretary of State for Education (d. 1994)
  1918   – George M. Leader, American soldier and politician, 36th Governor of Pennsylvania (d. 2013)
1920 – Georges Pichard, French author and illustrator (d. 2003)
1921 – Asghar Khan, Pakistani general and politician (d. 2018)
  1921   – Jackie Henderson, Scottish footballer (d. 2005)
  1921   – Charlie Mitten, English footballer and manager (d. 2002)
  1921   – Antonio Prohías, Cuban cartoonist (d. 1998)
1922 – Luis Echeverría, Mexican academic and politician, 50th President of Mexico (d. 2022)
  1922   – Nicholas Katzenbach, American soldier, lawyer, and politician, 65th United States Attorney General (d. 2012)
  1922   – Betty White, American actress, game show panelist, television personality, and animal rights activist (d. 2021)
1923 – Rangeya Raghav, Indian author and playwright (d. 1962)
1924 – Rik De Saedeleer, Belgian footballer and journalist (d. 2013)
  1924   – Jewel Plummer Cobb, American biologist, cancer researcher, and academic (d. 2017)
1925 – Gunnar Birkerts, Latvian-American architect (d. 2017)
  1925   – Robert Cormier, American author and journalist (d. 2000)
  1925   – Abdul Hafeez Kardar, Pakistani cricketer and author (d. 1996)
1926 – Newton N. Minow, American lawyer and politician
  1926   – Moira Shearer, Scottish-English ballerina and actress (d. 2006)
  1926   – Clyde Walcott, Barbadian cricketer (d. 2006)
1927 – Thomas Anthony Dooley III, American physician and humanitarian (d. 1961)
  1927   – Eartha Kitt, American actress and singer (d. 2008)
  1927   – Harlan Mathews, American lawyer and politician (d. 2014)
  1927   – E. W. Swackhamer, American director and producer (d. 1994)
1928 – Jean Barraqué, French composer (d. 1973)
  1928   – Vidal Sassoon, English-American hairdresser and businessman (d. 2012)
1929 – Jacques Plante, Canadian-Swiss ice hockey player, coach, and sportscaster (d. 1986)
  1929   – Tan Boon Teik, Malaysian-Singaporean lawyer and politician, Attorney-General of Singapore (d. 2012)
1931 – James Earl Jones, American actor
  1931   – Douglas Wilder, American sergeant and politician, 66th Governor of Virginia
  1931   – Don Zimmer, American baseball player, coach, and manager (d. 2014)
1932 – Sheree North, American actress and dancer (d. 2005)
1933 – Dalida, Egyptian-French singer and actress (d. 1987)
  1933   – Prince Sadruddin Aga Khan, French-Pakistani diplomat, United Nations High Commissioner for Refugees (d. 2003)
  1933   – Shari Lewis, American actress, puppeteer/ventriloquist, and television host (d. 1998)
1934 – Donald Cammell, Scottish-American director and screenwriter (d. 1996) 
1935 – Ruth Ann Minner, American businesswoman and politician, 72nd Governor of Delaware
1936 – John Boyd, English academic and diplomat, British ambassador to Japan (d. 2019)
  1936   – A. Thangathurai, Sri Lankan lawyer and politician (d. 1997)
1937 – Alain Badiou, French philosopher and academic
1938 – John Bellairs, American author and academic (d. 1991)
  1938   – Toini Gustafsson, Swedish cross country skier
1939 – Christodoulos of Athens, Greek archbishop (d. 2008)
  1939   – Maury Povich, American talk show host and producer
1940 – Nerses Bedros XIX Tarmouni, Egyptian-Armenian patriarch (d. 2015)
  1940   – Kipchoge Keino, Kenyan athlete
  1940   – Tabaré Vázquez, Uruguayan physician and politician, 39th President of Uruguay (d. 2020)
1941 – István Horthy, Jr., Hungarian physicist and architect
1942 – Muhammad Ali, American boxer and activist (d. 2016)
  1942   – Ita Buttrose, Australian journalist and author
  1942   – Ulf Hoelscher, German violinist and educator
  1942   – Nigel McCulloch, English bishop
1943 – Chris Montez, American singer-songwriter and guitarist
  1943   – René Préval, Haitian agronomist and politician, 52nd President of Haiti (d. 2017)
1944 – Ann Oakley, English sociologist, author, and academic
1945 – Javed Akhtar, Indian poet, playwright, and composer
  1945   – Anne Cutler, Australian psychologist and academic
1948 – Davíð Oddsson, Icelandic politician, 21st Prime Minister of Iceland
1949 – Anita Borg, American computer scientist and academic (d. 2003)
  1949   – Gyude Bryant, Liberian businessman and politician (d. 2014)
  1949   – Augustin Dumay, French violinist and conductor
  1949   – Andy Kaufman, American actor and comedian (d. 1984)
  1949   – Mick Taylor, English singer-songwriter and guitarist
1950 – Luis López Nieves, Puerto Rican-American author and academic
1952 – Tom Deitz, American author (d. 2009)
  1952   – Darrell Porter, American baseball player and sportscaster (d. 2002)
  1952   – Ryuichi Sakamoto, Japanese pianist, composer, and producer
1953 – Jeff Berlin, American bass player and educator
  1953   – Carlos Johnson, American singer and guitarist
1954 – Robert F. Kennedy, Jr., American lawyer, radio host, activist, and environmentalist
1955 – Steve Earle, American singer-songwriter, musician, record producer, author and actor
  1955   – Pietro Parolin, Italian cardinal
  1955   – Steve Javie, American basketball player and referee
1956 – Damian Green, English journalist and politician
  1956   – Paul Young, English singer-songwriter and guitarist
1957 – Steve Harvey, American actor, comedian, television personality and game show host
  1957   – Ann Nocenti, American journalist and author
1958 – Tony Kouzarides, English biologist, cancer researcher
1959 – Susanna Hoffs, American singer-songwriter, guitarist, and actress 
1960 – John Crawford, American singer-songwriter and guitarist 
  1960   – Chili Davis, Jamaican-American baseball player and coach
1961 – Brian Helgeland, American director, producer, and screenwriter
1962 – Jun Azumi, Japanese broadcaster and politician, 46th Japanese Minister of Finance 
  1962   – Jim Carrey, Canadian-American actor and producer
  1962   – Sebastian Junger, American journalist and author
1963 – Kai Hansen, German singer-songwriter, guitarist, and producer 
  1963   – Colin Gordon, English footballer, agent, manager and chief executive
1964 – Michelle Obama, American lawyer and activist, 44th First Lady of the United States
  1964   – John Schuster, Samoan-New Zealand rugby player
1965 – Sylvain Turgeon, Canadian ice hockey player
1966 – Trish Johnson, English golfer
  1966   – Joshua Malina, American actor
1967 – Richard Hawley, English singer-songwriter, guitarist, and producer 
1968 – Rowan Pelling, English journalist and author
  1968   – Ilja Leonard Pfeijffer, Dutch author, poet, and scholar
1969 – Naveen Andrews, English actor
  1969   – Lukas Moodysson, Swedish director, screenwriter, and author
  1969   – Tiësto, Dutch DJ and producer
1970 – Cássio Alves de Barros, Brazilian footballer
  1970   – Jeremy Roenick, American ice hockey player and actor
  1970   – Genndy Tartakovsky, Russian-American animator, director, and producer
1971 – Giorgos Balogiannis, Greek basketball player
  1971   – Richard Burns, English race car driver (d. 2005)
  1971   – Lil Jon, American rapper and producer
  1971   – Kid Rock, American singer-songwriter, producer, and actor
  1971   – Sylvie Testud, French actress, director, and screenwriter
1973 – Cuauhtémoc Blanco, Mexican footballer and actor
  1973   – Chris Bowen, Australian politician, 37th Treasurer of Australia
  1973   – Liz Ellis, Australian netball player and sportscaster
  1973   – Aaron Ward, Canadian ice hockey player and sportscaster
1974 – Yang Chen, Chinese footballer and manager
  1974   – Vesko Kountchev, Bulgarian viola player, composer, and producer
  1974   – Derrick Mason, American football player
1975 – Freddy Rodriguez, American actor
1978 – Lisa Llorens, Australian Paralympian  
  1978   – Ricky Wilson, English singer-songwriter 
1980 – Maksim Chmerkovskiy, Ukrainian-American dancer and choreographer
  1980   – Zooey Deschanel, American singer-songwriter and actress
  1980   – Modestas Stonys, Lithuanian footballer
1981 – Warren Feeney, Northern Irish footballer and manager
  1981   – Ray J, American singer, actor, and television personality
1982 – Dwyane Wade, American basketball player
  1982   – Amanda Wilkinson, Canadian singer
1983 – Álvaro Arbeloa, Spanish footballer
  1983   – Johannes Herber, German basketball player
  1983   – Rick Kelly, Australian race car driver
  1983   – Marcelo Garcia, Brazilian martial artist
1984 – Calvin Harris, Scottish singer-songwriter, DJ, and producer
1985 – Pablo Barrientos, Argentinian footballer
  1985   – Betsy Ruth, American wrestler and manager
  1985   – Simone Simons, Dutch singer-songwriter
1987 – Cody Decker, American baseball player
  1987   – Oleksandr Usyk, Ukrainian professional boxer
1988 – Andrea Antonelli, Italian motorcycle racer (d. 2013)
  1988   – Will Genia, Australian rugby player
  1988   – Héctor Moreno, Mexican footballer
1989 – Taylor Jordan, American baseball player
  1989   – Kelly Marie Tran, American actress
1990 – Santiago Tréllez, Colombian footballer
1991 – Trevor Bauer, American baseball player
  1991   – Esapekka Lappi, Finnish Rally Driver
  1991   – Slade Griffin, Australian rugby league player
  1991   – Alise Post, American BMX rider
1993 – Frankie Cocozza, British singer
1994 – Mark Steketee, Australian cricketer
1995 – Terutsuyoshi Shoki, Japanese sumo wrestler
  1995   – Indya Moore, American actor and model
1997 – Jake Paul, American YouTube personality, actor, rapper, and professional boxer
  1997   – Kyle Tucker, American baseball player
1998 – Jeff Reine-Adelaide, French footballer
  1998   – Sophie Molineux, Australian cricketer
1999 – Isa Briones, American actor and singer
2000 – Devlin DeFrancesco, Canadian race car driver
  2000   – Kang Chan-hee, South Korean singer and actor

Deaths

Pre-1600
 395 – Theodosius I, Roman emperor (b. 347)
 644 – Sulpitius the Pious, French bishop and saint
 764 – Joseph of Freising, German bishop
1040 – Mas'ud I of Ghazni, Sultan of the Ghaznavid Empire (b. 998)
1156 – André de Montbard, fifth Grand Master of the Knights Templar
1168 – Thierry, Count of Flanders (b. 1099)
1229 – Albert of Riga, German bishop (b. 1165)
1329 – Saint Roseline, Carthusian nun (b. 1263)
1334 – John of Brittany, Earl of Richmond (b. 1266)
1345 – Henry of Asti, Greek patriarch
  1345   – Martino Zaccaria, Genoese Lord of Chios
1369 – Peter I of Cyprus (b. 1328)
1456 – Elisabeth of Lorraine-Vaudémont, French translator (b. 1395)
1468 – Skanderbeg, Albanian soldier and politician (b. 1405)
1588 – Qi Jiguang, Chinese general (b. 1528)
1598 – Feodor I of Russia (b. 1557)

1601–1900
1617 – Fausto Veranzio, Croatian bishop and lexicographer (b. 1551)
1705 – John Ray, English botanist and historian (b. 1627)
1718 – Benjamin Church, American colonel (b. 1639)
1737 – Matthäus Daniel Pöppelmann, German architect (b. 1662)
1738 – Jean-François Dandrieu, French organist and composer (b. 1682)
1751 – Tomaso Albinoni, Italian violinist and composer (b. 1671)
1826 – Juan Crisóstomo Arriaga, Spanish-French composer (b. 1806)
1834 – Giovanni Aldini, Italian physicist and academic (b. 1762)
1850 – Elizabeth Simcoe, English-Canadian painter and author (b. 1762)
1861 – Lola Montez, Irish actress and dancer (b. 1821)
1863 – Horace Vernet, French painter (b. 1789)
1869 – Alexander Dargomyzhsky, Russian composer (b. 1813)
1878 – Edward Shepherd Creasy, English historian and jurist (b. 1812)
1884 – Hermann Schlegel, German ornithologist and herpetologist (b. 1804)
1887 – William Giblin, Australian lawyer and politician, 13th Premier of Tasmania (b. 1840)
1888 – Big Bear, Canadian tribal chief (b. 1825)
1891 – George Bancroft, American historian and politician, 17th United States Secretary of the Navy (b. 1800)
1893 – Rutherford B. Hayes, American general, lawyer, and politician, 19th President of the United States (b. 1822)
1896 – Augusta Hall, Baroness Llanover, Welsh writer and patron of the arts (b. 1802)

1901–present
1903 – Ignaz Wechselmann, Hungarian architect and philanthropist (b. 1828)
1908 – Ferdinand IV, Grand Duke of Tuscany (b. 1835)
1909 – Agathon Meurman, Finnish politician and journalist (b. 1826)
  1909   – Francis Smith, Australian lawyer, judge, and politician, 4th Premier of Tasmania (b. 1819)
1911 – Francis Galton, English polymath, anthropologist, and geographer (b. 1822)
1927 – Juliette Gordon Low, American founder of the Girl Scouts of the USA (b. 1860)
1930 – Gauhar Jaan, One of the first performers to record music on 78 rpm records in India. (b. 1873)
1931 – Grand Duke Peter Nikolaevich of Russia (b. 1864)
1932 – Ahmet Derviş, Turkish general (b. 1881)
  1932   – Albert Jacka, Australian captain, Victoria Cross recipient (b. 1893)
1933 – Louis Comfort Tiffany, American stained glass artist (b. 1848)
1936 – Mateiu Caragiale, Romanian journalist, author, and poet (b. 1885)
1942 – Walther von Reichenau, German field marshal (b. 1884)
1947 – Pyotr Krasnov, Russian historian and general (b. 1869)
  1947   – Jean-Marie-Rodrigue Villeneuve, Canadian cardinal (b. 1883)
1951 – Jyoti Prasad Agarwala, Indian poet, playwright, and director (b. 1903)
1952 – Walter Briggs Sr., American businessman (b. 1877)
1961 – Patrice Lumumba, Congolese politician, 1st Prime Minister of the Democratic Republic of the Congo (b. 1925)
1970 – Simon Kovar, Russian-American bassoon player and educator (b. 1890)
  1970   – Billy Stewart, American rhythm and blues singer and pianist (b. 1937)
1972 – Betty Smith, American author and playwright (b. 1896)
1977 – Dougal Haston, Scottish mountaineer (b. 1940)
  1977   – Gary Gilmore, American murderer (b. 1940)
1981 – Loukas Panourgias, Greek footballer and lawyer (b. 1899)
1984 – Kostas Giannidis, Greek pianist, composer, and conductor (b. 1903)
1987 – Hugo Fregonese, Argentinian director and screenwriter (b. 1908)
1988 – Percy Qoboza, South African journalist and author (b. 1938)
1991 – Olav V of Norway (b. 1903)
1992 – Frank Pullen, English soldier and businessman (b. 1915)
1993 – Albert Hourani, English-Lebanese historian and academic (b. 1915)
1994 – Yevgeni Ivanov, Russian spy (b. 1926)
  1994   – Helen Stephens, American runner, shot putter, and discus thrower (b. 1918)
1996 – Barbara Jordan, American lawyer and politician (b. 1936)
  1996   – Sylvia Lawler, English geneticist (b. 1922)
1997 – Bert Kelly, Australian farmer and politician, 20th Australian Minister for the Navy (b. 1912)
  1997   – Clyde Tombaugh, American astronomer and academic, discovered Pluto (b. 1906)
2000 – Philip Jones, English trumpet player and educator (b. 1928)
  2000   – Ion Rațiu, Romanian journalist and politician (b. 1917)
2002 – Camilo José Cela, Spanish author and politician, Nobel Prize laureate (b. 1916)
  2002   – Roman Personov, Russian physicist and academic (b. 1932)
2003 – Richard Crenna, American actor and director (b. 1926)
2004 – Raymond Bonham Carter, English banker (b. 1929)
  2004   – Harry Brecheen, American baseball player and coach (b. 1914)
  2004   – Ray Stark, American film producer (b. 1915)
  2004   – Noble Willingham, American actor (b. 1931)
2005 – Charlie Bell, Australian businessman (b. 1960)
  2005   – Virginia Mayo, American actress, singer, and dancer (b. 1920)
  2005   – Albert Schatz, American microbiologist and academic (b. 1920)
  2005   – Zhao Ziyang, Chinese politician, 3rd Premier of the People's Republic of China (b. 1919)
2006 – Pierre Grondin, Canadian surgeon (b. 1925)
2007 – Art Buchwald, American journalist and author (b. 1925)
  2007   – Yevhen Kushnaryov, Ukrainian engineer and politician (b. 1951)
  2007   – Uwe Nettelbeck, German record producer, journalist and film critic (b. 1940)
2008 – Bobby Fischer, American chess player and author (b. 1943)
  2008   – Ernie Holmes, American football player, wrestler, and actor (b. 1948)
2009 – Anders Isaksson, Swedish journalist and historian (b. 1943)
2010 – Gaines Adams, American football player (b. 1983)
  2010   – Jyoti Basu, Indian politician and 9th Chief Minister of West Bengal (b. 1914)
  2010   – Michalis Papakonstantinou, Greek journalist and politician, Foreign Minister of Greece (b. 1919)
  2010   – Erich Segal, American author and screenwriter (b. 1937)
2011 – Don Kirshner, American songwriter and producer (b. 1934)
2012 – Julius Meimberg, German soldier and pilot (b. 1917)
  2012   – Johnny Otis, American singer-songwriter and producer (b. 1921)
  2012   – Marty Springstead, American baseball player and umpire (b. 1937)
2013 – Mehmet Ali Birand, Turkish journalist and author (b. 1941)
  2013   – Jakob Arjouni, German author (b. 1964)
  2013   – Yves Debay, Belgian journalist (b. 1954)
  2013   – John Nkomo, Zimbabwean politician, Vice President of Zimbabwe (b. 1934)
  2013   – Lizbeth Webb, English soprano and actress (b. 1926)
2014 – Syedna Mohammed Burhanuddin, Indian spiritual leader, 52nd Da'i al-Mutlaq (b. 1915)
  2014   – Francine Lalonde, Canadian educator and politician (b. 1940)
  2014   – Alistair McAlpine, Baron McAlpine of West Green, English businessman and politician (b. 1942)
  2014   – John J. McGinty III, American captain, Medal of Honor recipient (b. 1940)
  2014   – Sunanda Pushkar, Indian-Canadian businesswoman (b. 1962)
  2014   – Suchitra Sen, Indian film actress (b. 1931) 
2015 – Ken Furphy, English footballer and manager (b. 1931)
  2015   – Faten Hamama, Egyptian actress and producer (b. 1931)
  2015   – Don Harron, Canadian actor and screenwriter (b. 1924)
2016 – Blowfly, American singer-songwriter and producer (b. 1939)
  2016   – Melvin Day, New Zealand painter and historian (b. 1923)
  2016   – V. Rama Rao, Indian lawyer and politician, 12th Governor of Sikkim (b. 1935)
  2016   – Sudhindra Thirtha, Indian religious leader (b. 1926)
2017 – Tirrel Burton, American football player and coach (b. 1929)
2018 – Jessica Falkholt, Australian actress (b. 1988)
2019 – S. Balakrishnan, Malayalam movie composer (b. 1948)
2020 – Derek Fowlds, British actor (b.1937) 
2021 – Rasheed Naz, Pakistani film and television actor (b. 1948)
2022 – Birju Maharaj, Indian dancer (b. 1937)
 2023 – Lucile Randon, French supercentenarian (b. 1904)

Holidays and observances
Christian feast day:
Anthony the Great 
Blessed Angelo Paoli
Blessed Gamelbert of Michaelsbuch
Charles Gore (Church of England)
Jenaro Sánchez Delgadillo (one of Saints of the Cristero War)
Mildgyth
Our Lady of Pontmain 
Sulpitius the Pious
January 17 (Eastern Orthodox liturgics)
National Day (Menorca, Spain)
The opening ceremony of Patras Carnival, celebrated until Clean Monday. (Patras)

References

External links

 BBC: On This Day
 
 Historical Events on January 17

Days of the year
January